Afro-Romanians are citizens or residents of Romania who are of African descent. Afro-Romanian populations are mostly concentrated in major cities of Romania. Africans have been immigrating to Romania since the Communist Era.

The majority of African-Romanians are of mixed ancestry, usually being the children of a Romanian parent and an African student who came to Romania. Nicolae Ceaușescu had a plan to educate the African elites. Most Africans who studied in Romania during the Ceaușescu era came from Sub-Saharan African countries such as Central African Republic, Sudan, DRC, Republic of the Congo, and other states, primarily from West Africa and Equatorial Africa, with which Ceaușescu developed close relations,
as well as from Maghreb (see Arabs in Romania).
Since the early 60s, young people from around the world came to study in the Socialist Republic of Romania. The communist state leadership wanted to link mutual friendship with different countries. It is estimated that during the communist era, about 10,000 Sudanese young people studied in Romania. 

After the fall of the communism, the numbers of Afro-Romanians increased. Currently, in Romania, most Africans are students, refugees, guest workers  or children from mixed-families of a Romanian parent and an African student or worker who came to Romania. In 2020, asylum applicants from Somalia and Eritrea represented the 6th and 9th highest  numbers among asylum applicants in Romania.

Areas 
In Bucharest, although Afro-Romanians live in all parts of the city, most of them are concentrated in the Giurgiului and Baicului areas.

Notable individuals

Fashion designers
Joseph Seroussi

Modelling
Agnès Matoko

Music
Kamara Ghedi  
Veronika Tecaru
Julie Mayaya
Tobi Ibitoye

Politicians
 Gaston Bienvenu Mboumba Bakabana

Sports
Nana Falemi - Footballer
Jean-Claude Bozga - Footballer
Calvin Tolmbaye - Footballer
Baudoin Kanda - Footballer
Yasin Hamed - Footballer
Karim Adeyemi - Footballer
Benjamin Adegbuyi - Kickboxer
Stephen Hihetah - Rugby player
Giordan Watson - Basketball player 
Uchechukwu Iheadindu - Basketball player
Annemarie Părău - Basketball player
Chike Onyejekwe - Handball player
Nneka Onyejekwe - Volleyball player

Television
Cabral Ibacka  
Laura Nureldin  
Nadine Voindrouh  
Désirée Malonga  
Florina Fernandes

See also
Immigration to Romania
Arabs in Romania

References

African diaspora in Europe
Ethnic groups in Romania
Romanian